The following is a timeline of the history of the city of Copenhagen, Denmark.

Prior to 17th century

 1167 – Absalon's Castle founded.
 1238 – Franciscan monastery founded.
 1254 – Copenhagen receives city charter.
 1294 – Wednesdays and Saturdays designated market days.
 1296 – House of the Holy Ghost founded.
 1388 – Church of Our Lady rebuilt.
 1417 – Eric of Pomerania takes Copenhagen Castle.
 1479 
 City hall built at Gammeltorv.
 University of Copenhagen founded.
 1493 - Govaert van Ghemen sets up printing press.
 1583 – Dyrehavsbakken founded near Copenhagen.

17th century
 1604 – Christian IV's Arsenal built.
 1608 – Caritas Well built.
 1610 
 City hall rebuilt.
 Nytorv created.
 1611 – Leda and the Swan statue erected.
 1618 – Brewery built.
 1624 – Rosenborg Castle built.
 1625 – Copenhagen Stock Exchange founded.
 1626 – Citadel built.
 1634 - 5 October:  of Magdalene Sibylle of Saxony and Christian, Prince-Elect of Denmark takes place.
 1640 – Børsen built.
 1648 – Royal Danish Library founded.
 1659 – Assault on Copenhagen
 1661 – Coat of arms of Copenhagen granted.
 1666 – Holmens Cemetery established.
 1670 – Kongens Nytorv laid out.
 1671 – Garnisons Cemetery inaugurated.
 1673 – Sophie Amalienborg built.
 1683 – Palace built for Ulrik Frederik Gyldenløve.
 1686 – Thott Palace built.
 1695 – Church of Our Saviour built.

18th century
 1711 – Plague.
 1722 - The first public theater, Lille Grønnegade Theatre, is founded.
 1728 
 Fire.
 City hall rebuilt between Gammeltorv and Nytorv.
 1742 - Royal Danish Academy of Sciences and Letters established.
 1745 – Christiansborg Palace built.
 1748 – Royal Danish Theatre founded.
 1751 – Mastekranen built.
 1752 – Oeder's Garden planted.
 1757 – Frederiks Hospital opens.
 1758 – Christian's Church built.
 1760 
 Amalienborg Palace built.
 Assistens Cemetery inaugurated.
 Moses & Søn G. Melchior in business.
 1769 - Population: 82,086.(da)
 1770 - City directory published.
 1771 – Royal Danish Ballet founded.
 1775
 Royal Porcelain Factory founded.
 P.F. Suhm library opens.
 1777 – Det Dramatiske Selskab is founded. 
 1781 – Vestindisk Pakhus built.
 1785 – Heering House built.
 1787 – J. Cl. Todes Døtreskole, the first secondary school for girls, is founded. 
 1791 – Døtreskolen af 1791 is founded. 
 1793 – Royal Danish Library opened to the public.
 1795 – Fire.

19th century
 1801 – Battle of Copenhagen.
 1807 
 Battle of Copenhagen
 Royal Commission for the Preservation of Antiquities established.
 1815 – Copenhagen Court House (with city hall) built at Nytorv.
 1825 
 Royal Danish Academy of Music founded.
 Kunstforeningen founded.
 1828 – Christiansborg Palace rebuilt.
 1829 – Church of Our Lady rebuilt.
 1835 - Andersen's Fairy Tales published.
 1840 - Population: 120,819.(da)
 1843 
 Tivoli Gardens opens.
 Tivoli Orchestra formed.
 1845 – Copenhagen co-host a nordic student meeting with Lund.
 1846 – Den højere Dannelsesanstalt for Damer is founded. 
 1847 
 Railway station built.
 Carlsberg brewery founded.
 1848 – Thorvaldsen Museum built.
 1850s – Edition Wilhelm Hansen music publisher in business.
 1856 – Royal School of Library and Information Science founded.
 1857 
 Folketeatret founded.
 Charlottenborg Spring Exhibition begins.
 1859 – Copenhagen Zoo founded.
 1860 – City gates dismantled.
 1862 – Copenhagen co-host a nordic student meeting with Lund.
 1865 – Hansen Writing Ball typewriter invented in Copenhagen.
 1870 
  (confectionery) in business.
 Østre Anlæg and Vestre Cemetery established.
 Population: 202,327.(da)
 1874 – Botanical Garden glasshouses built.
 1879
 Dansk Fotografisk Forening (photo society) headquartered in city.
 Vesterfælledvej truant school founded.
 1881 – Children's playground constructed.
 1882 – Ny Carlsberg Glyptotek established.
 1883 -  (theatre) opens.
 1884 – Dagbladet Politiken newspaper begins publication.
 1890 - Population: 367,262.(da)
 1894 – Frederik's Church, popularly known as the "Marble Church", opens.
 1895 - Copenhagen Women's Exhibition
 1896 – Statens Museum for Kunst established.
 1897 
 Østerport Station opens.
 Coast Line railway begins operating.

20th century

1900s-1940s
 1901
 City expands.
 Museum of Copenhagen and International Secretariat of National Trade Union Centres founded.
 Population: 468,936.(da)
 1905 – Copenhagen City Hall built on City Hall Square.
 1907 – Medical Museion established.
 1910
 Rigshospitalet built.
 International socialist women's conference held.
 1911
 Copenhagen Central Station, Idrætsparken, and Hirschsprung Collection open.
 Population: 584,089.(da)
 1912 – Theatre Museum in the Court Theatre founded.
 1913
 Dansk Statens Arkiv for Historiske Film og Stemmer (film archive) founded.
 The Little Mermaid (statue) unveiled.
 1915 - January: Conference of Socialist Parties of Neutral Countries held in Copenhagen.
 1917 -  (publisher) in business.
 1924 – Alexandra Teatret (cinema) opens.
 1925 
 Copenhagen Airport, Kastrup and Bakkehuset museum open.
 Danish National Symphony Orchestra founded.
 1926 – Forum Copenhagen built.
 1927 – Grundtvig's Church inaugurated.
 1928 
 Tøjhus Museum established.
 Christiansborg Palace rebuilt.
 1929 – Søndermark Cemetery established.
 1938 –  cinema built.
 1940 – April: German occupation begins.
 1945
 5 May: German occupation ends.
 Dagbladet Information (newspaper) begins publication.
 Population: 731,707.
 1948 – David Collection opens.

1950s-1990s
 1950 – Ryvangen Memorial Park officially inaugurated.
 1951 - 24 September: World's first successful sex reassignment surgery performed at Gentofte Hospital.
 1957 – World Santa Claus Congress begins near city.
 1958 - "Egg" and "swan" chair designs introduced.
 1962 – Strøget pedestrian zone laid out.
 1971
 Weekendavisen newspaper begins publication.
 Freetown Christiania founded.
 1973 – Roskilde Airport opens.
 1974 - Greater Copenhagen Council created.
 1975 -  cinema opens.
 1976
 Royal Danish Naval Museum established.
 Population: 1,292,647 urban area.(da)
 1977
 12 December: World's "first AIDS victim" dies in Copenhagen.
 Frieboeshvile restored.
 1978 – Danish Design Centre opens.
 1979 – Copenhagen Jazz Festival begins.
 1980 – Copenhagen Marathon begins.
 1983 – Radio Rosa begins broadcasting.
 1984 – Valby-Hallen opens.
 1986 
 Fotografisk Center and Rhythmic Music Conservatory established.
 Worker's Museum opens.
 1992 – Parken Stadium built.
 1995
 Copenhagen City Bikes launched.
 Danish Architecture Centre founded.
 1996 – National Museum of Photography and Cisternerne – Museum for moderne Glaskunst founded.
 1998 – Copenhagen Distortion begins.
 1999 – Black Diamond (library) built.
 2000 
 Øresund Bridge opens to Malmö, Sweden.
 Copenhagen Harbour Buses begin operating.

21st century

2000s
 2001 – Copenhagen Free University established.
 2002 – Copenhagen Metro and Copenhagen Harbour Baths inaugurated.
 2003 
 Copenhagen International Documentary Festival and Start! Festival begin.
 North Atlantic House cultural centre and Noma (restaurant) open.
 2004 
 Copenhagen Opera House and Danish Jewish Museum open.
 Natural History Museum of Denmark formed.
 2005 – VM Houses built.
 2006 – DieselHouse opens.
 2007
 City becomes part of the Capital Region of Denmark.
 Karriere Bar and Geranium (restaurant) open.
 Fictional The Killing (TV series) begins broadcasting.
 Homeless World Cup football contest held.
 2008 
 Royal Danish Playhouse opens in Frederiksstaden.
 21st European Film Awards held.
 Mountain Dwellings built.
 2009 
 United Nations Climate Change Conference held.
 CPH:PIX film festival begins.

2010s
 2010 – 8 House built.
 2011
 Torvehallerne (market) in business.
 MAD Symposium begins.
 2012
 Bicycle superhighway opens.
 Population: 1,213,882 urban area.(da)
 2014 - Cykelslangen (bike bridge) opens in Havneholmen.
 2015 – 14–15 February: 2015 Copenhagen shootings occur, killing two civilians and wounding five police officers. The suspected perpetrator was later shot and killed by police.

2020s
 2022
 3 July: The Field's mall shooting occurs, killing multiple people.

See also
 History of Copenhagen
 List of lord mayors of Copenhagen
 Copenhagen metropolitan area
 Urban area of Copenhagen
 Timelines of other cities in Denmark: Aarhus

References

This article incorporates information from the Danish Wikipedia.

Further reading

External links

 Europeana. Items related to Copenhagen, various dates
 Digital Public Library of America. Items related to Copenhagen, various dates.

Years in Denmark
 
Copenhagen
Copenhagen-related lists
Copenhagen